The Sedang people (In Vietnamese: Xê Đăng or Xơ Đăng) are an ethnic group of Vietnam. They mainly inhabit the Kon Tum province, Quảng Nam province (Trà My and Phước Sơn districts), Quảng Ngãi province (Sơn Tây district). They are made up of five main groups: Xơ Teng (Xteng), Kayong, Halang, Monom and Todrah. 

Their main source of income is farming, but before the 20th century, they mostly relied on hunting and gathering. They are also known to be raising cattle and poultry.

Religiously, they are largely animistic and Roman Catholic. Their language is part of North Bahnaric - a branch of the Mon–Khmer language family.

History

The myth of ethnic origin shows that these North Bahnaric groups are close to the Hmong–Mien inhabitants and some Sino–Tibetan groups, suggesting that their ancestors may have been too far from north. The closeness of their linguistic and cultural means to the language and culture of the ancient Vietic people provides more evidence. It is possible that the Chams ancestors separated them from the Vietic ancestors, and then the internal conflicts of the Mon–Khmer residents, the conflicts with the Cham people (12th - 15th centuries), Lao people (16th century), Siamese people  (18th - 19th centuries), the encroachment of other Mon-Khmer groups, such as Katu, Brau, Ta Oi ... from Laos, has narrowed their range of residence. Having been there for so long, they no longer remember the stories of the long migrations and they have attached their legends to some locations in northern Central Highlands.

Elite warriors, war horses, war elephants and logistics from Sedang tribes alongside Bahnar, Jarai and H're tribes kept an important role in the victories of Tây Sơn dynasty at the end of the 18th century.

Economic Activities
Monom group practices farming in a primitive way: tilling the land by driving buffalo herds to stomp then using wood or iron hoes to excavate. 

In the other groups, slash-and-burn agriculture play a dominant role, with tools and farming methods similar to other ethnic groups in the area: cutting trees with axes and knives, then burning with fire; using a sharpened stick or a stick with an iron blade to poke holes to sow seeds; weeding with a small hoe with a handle taken from a fork and a scraper with a bent blade to one side; harvesting the rice by hand. 

Their traditional livestock are water buffalo, goat, dog, and chicken. 

Kayong group has planted cinnamon trees. Blacksmithing has been developing in Todrah group area, they knew how to make iron from ore to forge metalwork.

Except a part of the Kayong group, other Sedang groups all know how to weave. In the past, the people only weaved with jute, wild or garden grown ramie. Currently, the Monom and Xteng groups still maintain that tradition. The Todrah and Halang groups have grown cotton plant for spinning and weaving.

Culture

Around the beginning of July, the Sedang people hold the Ondrô Lô Choi festival to sow seeds into the upland field and/or sow young rice plants into the patty field. When the rice plants has turned green, the festival Tra Ke Ton will be held for eating leftover rice seeds at the beginning of August.

They celebrate Peng Chupi Festival.

Notable people
 Thanh Minh Tám - A Núk (1936 - 2016), a Việt Cộng sapper of Gia Lai Province Command, who used 8 explosive charges to destroy 16 U.S. aircraft in the Attack on Camp Holloway, was awarded the Hero of the People's Armed Forces on September 19, 1967.
 Y Buông (born 1945), a female military cook of Kontum Province Command, who served mostly in  Đắk Tô battlefield, was awarded the Hero of the People's Armed Forces in 1972, member of the National Assembly term VI (1976 - 1981).

See also
List of ethnic groups in Vietnam

References

Xo Dang page
http://hedo-vietnam.tripod.com/ethnic_groups/xo_dang.htm

Ethnic groups in Vietnam